The Boy in the Box may refer to:

 "The Boy in the Box", a first season episode of Cold Case
  Boy in the Box (album), the second album by Corey Hart, released in 1985
 "Boy in the Box", the second single from Hart's Boy in the Box
 Joseph Augustus Zarelli, a 1957 child murder victim often called the "boy in the box"
 The Boy in the Box (Vidal, California), a trial held at the Riverside County Superior Court in Indio, California in 1969 and 1970
 Stolen (2009 drama film) (originally The Boy in the Box), a 2009 American drama mystery thriller film

The boy in the box was found dead on 1957
A couple year later from the DNA tests the little 4 year old boy was Joseph Augustus Zarelli.